Hutchinson station is a train station in Hutchinson, Kansas, United States, served by Amtrak's Southwest Chief train. Hutchinson station was originally a Victorian structure built in 1897 that was replaced by a more contemporary brick depot in 1950. Both buildings were built and owned by the Atchison, Topeka and Santa Fe Railway. The original station included The Bisonte, a former Harvey House.  From 2015 to 2019 the station has consistently been the least-frequented Amtrak station in Kansas.

The depot building also houses the Cool Beans restaurant.

See also 
List of Amtrak stations

References

External links

 Hutchinson Amtrak Station (USA Rail Guide -- Train Web)

Amtrak stations in Kansas
Railway stations in the United States opened in 1897
Railway stations in the United States opened in 1950
Atchison, Topeka and Santa Fe Railway stations
Hutchinson, Kansas
Buildings and structures in Reno County, Kansas
1897 establishments in Kansas